Veľké Borové is a village and municipality in Liptovský Mikuláš District in the Žilina Region of northern Slovakia.

History
In historical records the village was first mentioned in 1646.

Geography
The municipality lies at an altitude of 828 metres and covers an area of 10.985 km². It has a population of about 87 people.

External links
https://web.archive.org/web/20080111223415/http://www.statistics.sk/mosmis/eng/run.html 

Villages and municipalities in Liptovský Mikuláš District